Michael Anthony Gallego (born October 31, 1960) is an American former professional baseball player and current coach. He also played for the New York Yankees and the St. Louis Cardinals. After his playing career,  Gallego served as a major league coach.

Career
Gallego was born in Whittier, California, of Mexican descent. Before playing professionally, he graduated from St. Paul High School, where he lettered in baseball and football, and then attended the University of California, Los Angeles (1978–81, history major). Gallego represented the United States at the 1979 Pan American Games.
 He was the Athletics starting second baseman during their three-year run of American League Championships from 1988 through 1990, which included a World Series sweep in 1989 against their Bay Area rivals, the San Francisco Giants. Throughout his career, he was known more for his glove than his bat. In 1990, he led the AL in sacrifice hits with 17. He had 28 hits without an extra-base hit in 1995, still the post-1912 non-pitcher record. Gallego's 12 home runs in 1991 set a career high.

While playing with the Yankees from 1992 to 1994, Gallego was the last player to wear the uniform number 2 prior to the Yankees' former All-Star shortstop, Derek Jeter. Upon his return to the Oakland A's in 1987, Gallego refused to give up uniform #9 that Reggie Jackson had worn previously with the A's, forcing Jackson to wear #44 for his final season.

Gallego closed out his career with the Cardinals in 1996 and 1997, where he once again played under Tony La Russa, his manager while with the A's.

Gallego was named the Colorado Rockies third base and infield coach in December 2004 and coached until October 7, 2008. He was hired as the A's third base coach and infield instructor during the 2008 offseason. He was dismissed on August 24, 2015.

On November 25, 2015, Gallego was announced as director of baseball development for the Los Angeles Angels of Anaheim. He was promoted to third base coach for the 2019 season, and to bench coach prior to the 2020 season.

Personal life
Gallego and his wife Caryn have three children, Joe, Niko and Ali. His son Niko also played for UCLA baseball and was signed with the Arizona Diamondbacks in July 2010. Niko helped the Bruins to the Championship Series of the 2010 College World Series, where they lost to South Carolina for the national championship. Following his graduation from UCLA, Niko began playing for the Visalia Rawhide of the California League.  He is the uncle of Los Angeles Dodgers catcher Austin Barnes. He is of Mexican descent.

References

External links

Mike Gallago at Baseball Almanac

1960 births
Living people
Albany A's players
American baseball players of Mexican descent
American expatriate baseball players in Canada
Baseball players at the 1979 Pan American Games
Baseball coaches from California
Baseball players from California
Colorado Rockies (baseball) coaches
Edmonton Trappers players
Fort Lauderdale Yankees players
Los Angeles Angels coaches
Louisville Redbirds players
Major League Baseball bench coaches
Major League Baseball second basemen
Major League Baseball third base coaches
Minor league baseball coaches
Modesto A's players
New York Yankees players
Oakland Athletics coaches
Oakland Athletics players
Pan American Games competitors for the United States
Sportspeople from Whittier, California
St. Louis Cardinals players
St. Petersburg Cardinals players
Tacoma Tigers players
UCLA Bruins baseball players
West Haven A's players